Edouard Morlet (born 24 June 1898, date of death unknown) was a Belgian footballer. He played in three matches for the Belgium national football team from 1923 to 1924.

References

External links
 

1898 births
Year of death missing
Belgian footballers
Belgium international footballers
Place of birth missing
Association football defenders